The American Society for Pharmacology and Experimental Therapeutics (ASPET) is a scientific society founded in late 1908 by John Jacob Abel of Johns Hopkins University (also the founder of the American Society for Biochemistry and Molecular Biology), with the aim of promoting the growth of pharmacological research. Many society members are researchers in basic and clinical pharmacology who help develop disease-fighting medications and therapeutics. ASPET is one of the constituent societies of the Federation of American Societies for Experimental Biology (FASEB). The society's headquarters are in Rockville, MD. The current president is Michael F. Jarvis.

Publications
The society publishes three research journals and a review journal: the Journal of Pharmacology and Experimental Therapeutics, Drug Metabolism and Disposition, Molecular Pharmacology, and Pharmacological Reviews

Starting in 2012 these publications are only offered online. The society copublishes a wholly open access journal with the British Pharmacological Society and Wiley entitled Pharmacology Research & Perspectives.

ASPET also publishes a quarterly newsletter, The Pharmacologist, and, from 2001 to 2011, Molecular Interventions magazine.

Awards
The society gives out several awards:
John J. Abel Award
Julius Axelrod Award
Pharmacia-ASPET Award in Experimental Therapeutics
Robert R. Ruffolo Career Achievement Award
Travel Award for Pharmacology Educators
Bernard B. Brodie Award in Drug Metabolism
P.B. Dews Lifetime Achievement Award for Research in Behavioral Pharmacology
Drug Metabolism Early Career Achievement Award
Goodman and Gilman Award in Receptor Pharmacology
Benedict R. Lucchesi Distinguished Lectureship in Cardiac Pharmacology
Torald Sollmann Award in Pharmacology
Paul M. Vanhoutte Distinguished Lectureship in Cardiovascular Pharmacology
Travel awards to participate in its meetings are also given to students and postdocs.

See also
Chemotherapy
Clinical pharmacology
Drug metabolism
Neuropharmacology
Pharmacology
Toxicology

References

External links
 
 Molecular Interventions magazine

Learned societies of the United States
Biology societies
Organizations established in 1908
1908 establishments in Maryland
Pharmacological societies